The Grigorovich MR-3 (Morskoi Razviedchik - 3) was a prototype maritime patrol flying boat built in the Soviet Union during the late 1920s that was not accepted for production.

Specifications MR-3

References

2. http://www.all-aero.com/index.php/34-planes/20666-grigorovich-rom-1-grigorovich-mr-3

Bibliography
 

MDR-3
1920s Soviet patrol aircraft
Flying boats
Single-engined tractor aircraft
Aircraft first flown in 1929